Typhoon Soulik was an unusually large, and the deadliest typhoon to strike the Korean Peninsula since Khanun in 2012. Soulik formed from an area of low pressure on August 15, and was the twenty-ninth tropical depression, twentieth tropical storm, tenth severe tropical storm, and sixth typhoon of the 2018 Pacific typhoon season.

Meteorological history

The system was located in favorable conditions for development, though its low-level circulation remained elongated. Convective bands began to form around the system, though they remained shallow; by 15:00 UTC, the JTWC upgraded its development potential in the next day to medium. Convection began to deepen and wrap into a consolidating low-level circulation, and at 22:30 UTC, the JTWC issued a Tropical Cyclone Formation Alert on the system.

On August 15 at 06:00 UTC, the Japan Meteorological Agency (JMA) began monitoring a tropical depression in the Philippine Sea. Deep convection was located southeast of a broad and elongated low-level circulation. Conditions remained favorable for further development as the depression began consolidating despite an exposed low-level circulation, and on August 16 at 00:00 UTC, the JMA upgraded the depression to a tropical storm, giving it the name Soulik. Convective banding began to wrap into the still-exposed low-level circulation, and at 03:00 UTC, the JTWC also upgraded Soulik to a tropical storm. Soulik then organized rapidly as its low-level circulation became more defined, and at 18:00 UTC, the JMA further upgraded Soulik to a severe tropical storm. By 21:00 UTC, a low-level eye feature appeared as its structure began to rapidly improve, and on August 17 at 03:00 UTC, the JTWC upgraded Soulik to a typhoon. At 12:00 UTC, the JMA also upgraded Soulik to a typhoon as it was steered by a mid-level subtropical high-pressure area.

It also began to display some annular characteristics. After passing the Ryukyu Islands early on 22 August, the storm gradually weakened due to low sea-surface temperatures. On August 23, Soulik made landfall over Haenam County, South Jeolla Province of South Korea at around 23:00 KST (14:00 UTC).

Impact

Total damage in South Korea were at ₩50.7 billion (US$45 million). Economic loss in Northeast China were counted to be CN￥550 million (US$79.9 million). Flooding in North Korea triggered by Soulik killed 86 people.

See also
Weather of 2018
Tropical cyclones in 2018
Other systems named Soulik
Typhoon Haishen (2020)
Typhoon Rusa – Another typhoon that killed over 200 people in the Korean Peninsula.

References

External links

 General Information of Typhoon Soulik (1819) from Digital Typhoon
 JMA Best Track Data of Typhoon Soulik (1819) (in Japanese)
 JMA Best Track (Graphics) of Typhoon Soulik (1819)

Tropical cyclones in 2018